Debates took place among candidates in the campaign for the Republican Party's nomination for the president in the 2020 United States presidential election. The Republican National Committee (RNC) did not schedule any official RNC-sanctioned primary debates, and incumbent President Donald Trump stated that he would not debate any primary challenger. Thus, the debates held among Trump's primary challengers were instead sponsored by private organizations.

Debates 

The Republican National Committee (RNC) chose not to schedule any official RNC-sanctioned primary debates. On May 3, 2018, the RNC eliminated its debate committee for the 2020 election cycle, as John Hammond, the co-chairman of the RNC's subcommittee governing the primary process, stated that it would be less relevant "as we continue to support the President and the vice president and the current administration". Trump also stated on September 9, 2019, that he was not willing to debate any primary challenger, saying, "I'm not looking to give them any credibility."

Business Insider announced on September 10, 2019 that it would host a debate on September 24, inviting Trump and his main primary challengers. 

Politicon, a nonpartisan political convention, announced on October 22, 2019 that it would host a debate on October 26 among Trump's three main primary challengers.

The Forbes Under 30 Summit hosted a debate on October 28 between Mark Sanford, Bill Weld, and Joe Walsh.

Schedule

Participation 
The following is a table of participating candidates in each debate:

Business Insider debate (September 24, 2019)

Business Insiders 2020 Republican primary debate was held on September 24, 2019, at the headquarters of Business Insider in New York City. It was streamed on Business Insider Today, their daily Facebook Watch show and streamed live on the Business Insider website. It was hosted by Business Insider CEO Henry Blodget and moderated by its politics editor Anthony Fisher, and its opinion columnist Linette Lopez.

Joe Walsh and Bill Weld attended the debate, but Mark Sanford declined due to scheduling conflicts, and Donald Trump did not respond to the invitation.

The debate was characterized by a focus on Trump, with both attending candidates spending the majority of their time criticizing him. Other topics that were discussed included climate change, Iran, and automation.

Politicon debate (October 26, 2019)Politicon's 2020 Republican primary debate was held on October 26, 2019, at Politicon in Nashville, Tennessee. Sanford, Walsh and Weld were all in attendance.

Forbes debate (October 28, 2019)Forbess 2020 Republican primary debate was held on October 28, 2019, at the Detroit Masonic Temple in Detroit. It was moderated by Randall Lane and Daniela Pierre-Bravo.

Joe Walsh, Bill Weld and Mark Sanford all attended the debate.

Among other issues, Trump's potential impeachment and climate change were discussed.

See also
 2020 Republican Party presidential primaries
 2020 United States presidential debates

References

2020 United States presidential debates
2020